Free b (Welsh: Bws am ddim Free bus) was a zero-fare shuttle bus that operated in Cardiff city centre, Wales. The route circled the edges of the city centre anti-clockwise. The service was operated by Cardiff Bus.

History
The service commenced on 12 October 2009 as a response to the creation of a "bus box" in Cardiff city centre. This was formed from the diversion of the terminus of many of Cardiff Bus's services from the Central Bus Station to stops around the edges of the city centre. The shuttle service was introduced to connect these stops, as well as those of Cardiff's four Park and Ride services.

The three 28-seater buses in a yellow and black livery were introduced as part of a multimillion-pound joint council and Assembly Government-funded green initiative designed to encourage sustainable transport.

Cardiff Council announced that because of low ridership, the Free b bus would be cancelled and replaced with an electric shuttle van. Council-operated electric buggies were introduced in October 2010 in order to carry disabled and elderly passengers around the city centre.

Operation

The Free b service followed a circular route that travels anti-clockwise around the city centre linking major bus and rail interchanges. The FreeB operated every 10 minutes until 20:00 on weekdays and until 18:00 on the weekend.

Stops
Churchill Way - for Cardiff Queen Street railway station and Capitol Shopping Centre
Windsor Lane
Greyfriars Road for New Theatre
Greyfriars Road -  for Hilton Hotel, Queens Arcade, Capital Tower, City Hall and National Museum
Castle Street - for Cardiff Castle
Westgate Street - for Millennium Stadium
St Mary Street - for St David's Hall
Cardiff Central bus station (stand D1A) - for Cardiff Central railway station and Millennium Stadium
Wyndham Arcade - for Hard Rock Café
Canal Street - for Marriott Hotel, The Hayes, St David's and Cardiff Central Library
David Street - for Cardiff International Arena

Criticism
The service had been criticised as not running until late enough and a lack of publicity.

See also
Bus transport in Cardiff
Transport in Cardiff
Transport in Wales

References

External links
Free b advertisement

Zero-fare transport services
Transport in Cardiff
Bus transport in Wales
Bus transport in Cardiff
Bus routes in Wales